Gagik Sargsyan (6 April 1926, in Yerevan – 25 August 1998, in Yerevan) was an Armenian historian, who was the vice president of the Armenian Academy of Sciences.

Biography 
Sarkisyan studied at Yerevan State University, then finished Leningrad State University in 1950. From 1954 to 1962, he worked at the Institute of History of the Armenian Academy of Sciences, and was deputy director of the Institute of History of the Armenian Academy of Sciences (1962-1966). He was the director of the Institute of Oriental Studies of the Armenian Academy of Sciences and a professor at Yerevan State University. He was academic-secretary of the humanitarian branch of the Armenian Academy of Sciences.

He is known for his works dedicated to Armenian and Oriental history, including the academic work dedicated to the Armenian historian Movses Khorenatsi.

Honors and awards
Honorary member of Syrian Historical Society (1985)
State Prize of Armenia (1985)

External links
History of Armenia of Khorenatsi at Vehi

References

20th-century Armenian historians
Academic staff of Yerevan State University
1998 deaths
1926 births